The 1893 Iowa gubernatorial election was held on November 7, 1893. Republican nominee Frank D. Jackson defeated Democratic incumbent Horace Boies with 49.74% of the vote.

General election

Candidates
Major party candidates
Frank D. Jackson, Republican
Horace Boies, Democratic 

Other candidates
J. M. Joseph, People's
Bennett Mitchell, Prohibition

Results

References

1893
Iowa